James Madison Morton Jr. (August 24, 1869 – June 26, 1940) was a United States circuit judge of the United States Court of Appeals for the First Circuit and previously was a United States District Judge of the United States District Court for the District of Massachusetts.

Education and career

Born on August 24, 1869, in Fall River, Massachusetts, Morton's father, James Madison Morton Sr., was a prominent Boston lawyer who eventually served on the state supreme court. Morton received an Artium Baccalaureus degree in 1891 from Harvard University and received an Artium Magister degree in 1894 from the same institution. He received a Bachelor of Laws in 1894 from Harvard Law School. He was in private practice in Fall River from 1894 to 1912.

Federal judicial service

Morton was nominated by President William Howard Taft on August 9, 1912, to a seat on the United States District Court for the District of Massachusetts vacated by Judge Frederic Dodge. He was confirmed by the United States Senate on August 12, 1912, and received his commission the same day. His service terminated on January 19, 1932, due to his elevation to the First Circuit.

Morton was nominated by President Herbert Hoover on December 15, 1931, to a seat on the United States Court of Appeals for the First Circuit vacated by Judge George W. Anderson. He was confirmed by the Senate on January 6, 1932, and received his commission on January 9, 1932. He assumed senior status on September 30, 1939. His service terminated on June 26, 1940, due to his death in Fall River.

References

1869 births
1940 deaths
Harvard Law School alumni
Judges of the United States District Court for the District of Massachusetts
United States district court judges appointed by William Howard Taft
Judges of the United States Court of Appeals for the First Circuit
United States court of appeals judges appointed by Herbert Hoover
20th-century American judges
People from Fall River, Massachusetts
Harvard College alumni